Keshmesh Tappeh is a village in Qaleh Darrehsi Rural District of the Central District of Maku County, West Azerbaijan province, Iran. At the 2006 National Census, its population was 2,655 in 594 households. The following census in 2011 counted 3,623 people in 935 households. The latest census in 2016 showed a population of 4,046 people in 1,079 households; it was the largest village in its rural district.

References 

Maku County

Populated places in West Azerbaijan Province

Populated places in Maku County